
Gmina Łaskarzew is a rural gmina (administrative district) in Garwolin County, Masovian Voivodeship, in east-central Poland. Its seat is the town of Łaskarzew, although the town is not part of the territory of the gmina.

Villages
Gmina Łaskarzew contains the villages and settlements of Aleksandrów, Budel, Budy Krępskie, Celinów, Dąbrowa, Dąbrowa-Kolonia, Grabina, Izdebno, Izdebno-Kolonia, Kacprówek, Krzywda, Ksawerynów, Leokadia, Lewików, Lipniki, Melanów, Nowy Helenów, Nowy Pilczyn, Polesie Rowskie, Rowy, Sośninka, Stary Helenów, Stary Pilczyn, Uścieniec, Wanaty, Wola Łaskarzewska, Wola Rowska and Zygmunty.

Neighbouring gminas
Gmina Łaskarzew is bordered by the town of Łaskarzew and by the gminas of Garwolin, Górzno, Maciejowice, Sobolew and Wilga.

References
Polish official population figures 2006

Laskarzew
Garwolin County